Kirstead Green is a village in the English county of Norfolk. Administratively it is part of the civil parish of Kirstead  within the district of South Norfolk.

External links 

Parish contacts

Villages in Norfolk
South Norfolk